Matt Simpson is an American politician currently serving in his first term in the Alabama House of Representatives for House District 96, which he was elected to in November 2018.

Early life and education 
Simpson was born and raised in Mobile, where he attended Murphy High School. He earned a bachelor's degree in political science with a minor in criminal justice from the University of Alabama and has a Juris Doctor degree from Samford University Cumberland School of Law, where he served on the Student Honor Board and was a member of the National Mock Trial Team.

For 12 years, Simpson had a career as a prosecutor for the Mobile County District Attorney's Office and as child victims prosecutor for the Baldwin County District Attorney's Office.  He currently works a civil litigator in Daphne, Alabama.

Simpson previously served as chairman of the Baldwin County Republican Party and of the Baldwin County Young Republicans. Simpson has served on the Alabama Republican Party State Executive Committee and is the current ALGOP Vice-Chairman for Congressional District 1.

Political career 
Simpson is a member of several legislative committees, including the Judiciary Committee; the Ethics and Campaign Finance Committee; the Commerce and Small Business Committee; the Sunset Committee; the Mobile County Legislation Committee and the Baldwin County Legislation Committee. He serves as Vice Chairman of the Joint Legislative Committee for Aerospace and Defense and is a member of the Joint Legislative Committee for Mental Health.

In 2021, Representative Simpson was named as Chairman of the Baldwin County Legislation Committee. In 2022, he was elected as Caucus Freshman Representative for the Alabama House Republican Caucus.

Key issues and legislation

Mental health 
Simpson sponsored and passed legislation that funded and created the Baldwin County Mental Health Court, a diversionary court program that places people with mental illnesses into treatment programs in lieu of jail time and secured a $100,000 grant to hasten the program's implementation. He has also sponsored legislation that would cover the costs of treatment for Post Traumatic Stress Disorder for first responders.

Public safety 
Simpson sponsored and passed legislation to create the Alabama State of Emergency Consumer Protection Act, which created the crime of aggravated home repair fraud. He also sponsored legislation that makes possessing a stolen firearm a Class C felony in Alabama and legislation that added enhanced sentences for people convicted of child sex abuse.

References 

Republican Party members of the Alabama House of Representatives
Year of birth missing (living people)
Living people